Neysa Chah (also Romanized as Neysā Chāh; also known as Nesā Chāh) is a village in Nowsher-e Koshk-e Bijar Rural District, Khoshk-e Bijar District, Rasht County, Gilan Province, Iran. As of the 2006 census, its population was 106, with there being 37 families.

References 

Populated places in Rasht County